Gymnastics events were competed at the 1967 Pan American Games in Winnipeg, Canada.


Medal table

Medalists

Men's events

Women's events

See also
 Pan American Gymnastics Championships
 South American Gymnastics Championships
 Gymnastics at the 1968 Summer Olympics

References 
  .
 
 

1967
1967 Pan American Games
International gymnastics competitions hosted by Canada